Epiconcana is a genus of moths of the family Erebidae. The genus was erected by George Hampson in 1926.

Species
Epiconcana polyleuca Hampson, 1926
Epiconcana leucomera Dyar, 1912

References

Calpinae